Alberta Provincial Highway No. 62, commonly referred to as Highway 62, is a  north–south highway in southern Alberta, Canada that connects Highway 5 in Magrath to the Canada–United States border south of Del Bonita.  It continues as Montana Secondary Highway 213 in the United States.

Major intersections 
From south to north.

References 

062